Crawford Long is a 1926 marble sculpture depicting the American surgeon and pharmacist of the same name by J. Massey Rhind, installed in the United States Capitol, in Washington, D.C., as part of the National Statuary Hall Collection.  It is one of two statues donated by the U.S. state of Georgia.

The work was unveiled on unveiled March 30, 1926.

As befitted the subject, Rhind had the statue carved from Georgia marble  by Georgia sculptor James K Watt.

See also
 1926 in art

References

External links
 

1926 establishments in Washington, D.C.
1926 sculptures
Bronze sculptures in Washington, D.C.
Monuments and memorials in Washington, D.C.
Long, Crawford
Sculptures of men in Washington, D.C.
Sculptures by J. Massey Rhind